The 1997–98 Saint Louis Billikens men's basketball team represented Saint Louis University in the 1997–98 NCAA Division I men's basketball season. The Billikens were led by head coach Charlie Spoonhour who was in his sixth season at Saint Louis. The team played their home games at the Kiel Center and were a member of Conference USA. The Billikens finished the season 22–11, 11–5 in C-USA play to finish 3rd in the American division. They lost in the quarterfinal round of the C-USA tournament, but received an at-large bid to the NCAA tournament as No. 10 seed in the Southeast region. The Billikens eliminated UMass in the opening round before they were defeated by No. 2 seed and eventual National Champion Kentucky in the second round.

Highly touted freshman Larry Hughes set the school's single season scoring record in his only college season. Hughes was named USBWA National Freshman of the Year and was later taken 8th overall by the Philadelphia 76ers in the 1998 NBA draft.

Roster

Schedule and results

|-
!colspan=9 style=| Regular season

|-
!colspan=9 style=| C-USA tournament

|-
!colspan=9 style=| NCAA tournament

Rankings

Team players drafted into the NBA

References

Saint Louis
Saint Louis Billikens men's basketball seasons
Saint Louis
Saint
Saint